145th Street is a major crosstown street in the Harlem neighborhood, in the New York City borough of Manhattan. It is one of the 15 crosstown streets mapped out in the Commissioner's Plan of 1811 that established the numbered street grid in Manhattan. It forms the northern border of the Sugar Hill neighborhood within Harlem.

Description
145th Street starts on the West Side at the Henry Hudson Parkway (New York State Route 907V), crossing Riverside Drive, Broadway, Amsterdam Avenue, Convent Avenue and Saint Nicholas Avenue. The street passes Edgecombe Avenue and Bradhurst Avenue, where 145 Street forms the southern border of Jackie Robinson Park. The street continues, crossing Frederick Douglass Boulevard, Adam Clayton Powell Boulevard and Lenox Avenue, before crossing over the Harlem River Drive and then connecting to The Bronx over the Harlem River via the 145th Street Bridge.

Transportation
The Bx19 traverses 145th Street from end-to-end, starting with a loop in Riverbank State Park and heading back to the Bronx over the 145th Street Bridge to the New York Botanical Garden.

Subway stations are, west to east:
145th Street serving the  route at Broadway
145th Street serving the  routes at Saint Nicholas Avenue
145th Street serving the  route at Lenox Avenue

References
Notes

External links

145th STREET, Hamilton Heights Forgotten-NY Guide to 145th Street

145
Harlem